The Border-to-Border (B2B) Trail is a partially constructed non-motorized trail in Washtenaw County, Michigan.

In thirteen segments from A to M, it will link Huron-Clinton Metroparks with Dexter Township, the Village of Dexter, Scio Township, the City of Ann Arbor, Ann Arbor Township, Ypsilanti Township, and the City of Ypsilanti. The trail is being developed in sub-segments (e.g. C1 and C2 make up part of C). As each segment is developed, there are sometimes refinements to the actual path. In the interest of continuity, parts of the current trail do not reflect the planned final route, but use existing surface streets until the final trail can be constructed.

Route 

On 24 September 2010, part of the border-to-border route in Ypsilanti was opened for access to the public. This temporary route, constructed using crushed-concrete, extends from Michigan Avenue Bridge, over the Huron River to Park Street.  Friends of the Border-to-Border trail called it "almost an urban wilderness".

The whole  planned Border-to-Border route, segments A to M, is from Livingston County to Wayne County along the Huron River.
Segment C is a  routed proposed north from Dexter to Hudson Mills Metropark.

The trail

References

External links

 Friends of the Border to Border Trail website

Hiking trails in Michigan
Transportation in Ann Arbor, Michigan
Ypsilanti, Michigan